Ferenc Jancsin  (2 April 1912, Budapest – 2002) was a Hungarian classical violinist and music educator, and the concertmaster of the Hungarian State Opera.

Education
He studied violin at the Franz Liszt Academy of Music in Budapest  (1929–1933), where his teachers were  Oszkár Studer and Ede Zathureczky, and from 1931 Jenő Hubay in his  master class. His chamber music teacher was Leó Weiner.

Career
Jancsin started his career as the member of the Hungarian State Opera's orchestra in 1933. He became its first concertmaster of it in 1936, and held the post until 1971. Before World War II, he gave solo concerts Hungary and in Sweden, Austria, Italy, and Czechoslovakia. After the war, he stayed in Hungary, where he founded his chamber group in 1947, the Jancsin quartet, which and led it until 1968. Besides his solo concerts, and chamber music concerts he became a lecturer at the Béla Bartók Conservatory in Budapest.

He made his first recordings  under the label of the Hungarian music publisher Radiola from 1930; now these are published by the Rózsavölgyi és Társa Kft on CD.

References

Sources
 Szabolcsi Bence - Tóth Aladár: Zenei lexikon, Zeneműkiadó Vállalat, 1965. II. p. 266. "Jancsin Ferenc", in Hungarian
 Jancsin Ferenc, 1997.  április, Muzsika

External links
 Ferenc Jancsin plays Enrico Toselli: Serenade 
 Ferenc Jancsin  plays František  Drdla:  Souvenir

1912 births
2002 deaths
Hungarian classical violinists
Male classical violinists
20th-century classical violinists
Hungarian music educators
20th-century Hungarian male musicians